Crazy Eyes is a 1973 album by Poco, or the title song.

Crazy Eyes may also refer to:

Crazy Eyes (film), a 2012 film
 Crazy Eyes (Filter album), 2016

People/characters
Crazy Eyes (character), Suzanne "Crazy Eyes" Warren, a character from Orange Is the New Black played by Uzo Aduba
A character from the 2002 Adam Sandler film Mr. Deeds played by Steve Buscemi

Songs
Song from the 1976 Hall & Oates album Bigger Than Both of Us
Song from the 1981 Don McLean album Believers
Song from the 1998 Show-Ya album This My Way
Song by Dave's True Story, featured in the 2001 film Kissing Jessica Stein
Track from the 2007 The Jerky Boys comedy album Sol's Rusty Trombone
Song from the 2008 Old Crow Medicine Show, album Tennessee Pusher